James Sandilands may refer to:

James Sandilands, 1st Lord Torphichen (c. 1511–1596), Scottish nobleman
James Sandilands, 1st Lord Abercrombie (before 1627 – after 1667), Scottish nobleman
James Sandilands, 2nd Lord Abercrombie (1645–1681), Scottish nobleman
James Sandilands, 7th Lord Torphichen (died 1753), Scottish nobleman and army officer
James Walter Sandilands (1874–1959), British army officer
James Sandilands (courtier) (died 1618), courtier to King James VI and I